Sarcohyla is a genus of frogs in the family Hylidae. It is endemic to Mexico and is found in the montane parts of the country between Durango in the north and Guerrero in the south. The generic name is derived from the Greek sarkodes meaning "fleshy" in combination with Hylas and refers to the thick, glandular skin characteristic of most of the species in the genus.

Description
Sarcohyla are moderate to large-sized frogs. They have thick, glandular skin. Osteological characteristics include enlarged prepollex without a projecting spine and the alary process of the premaxilla that is not bifurcate posteriorly.

Taxonomy
Sarcohyla was erected in 2016 based on molecular data. It contains species that were allocated to "Hyla bistincta" and "Hyla arborescandens groups" by Duellman in 2001 and to "Plectrohyla bistincta group" in some later works. Its sister group is Plectrohyla. Not all species of the genus were included in the molecular analysis, and there is some concern that the omitted species could challenge monophyly of the genus.

Species
The genus contains 26 species:

References

 
Amphibian genera
Amphibians of North America
Endemic amphibians of Mexico
Taxa named by William Edward Duellman
Taxa named by Stephen Blair Hedges